Adderly is a Canadian television adventure-drama series which aired from 1986 to 1988. It was broadcast on both Canadian TV and on CBS in the United States. It starred Vancouver-born Winston Rekert as "charming and witty V.H. Adderly," an operative working for an obscure government intelligence agency.

Background
Adderly was based on series creator Elliott Baker's novel, Pocock & Pitt.

Cast
 Winston Rekert as V.H. (Virgil Homer) Adderly
 Jonathan Welsh as Melville Greenspan
 Dixie Seatle as Mona Ellerby
 Ken Pogue as Major Jonathan B. Clack

Occasional:
 Mairlyn Smith as Debbie Greenspan
 Jack Leitch as Victor Barinov

Plot
V.H. Adderly (Rekert) is a secret agent for an organization known as the I.S.I (International Security and Intelligence). Before the series begins, an enemy agent, Victor Barinov, crushes Adderly's left hand with a medieval mace during an interrogation in East Germany. Adderly loses the use of the hand, and since he is no longer considered useful as an active agent, he is reassigned to the I.S.I.'s tiny Department of Miscellaneous Affairs, located in a small basement office. This is meant to be a sort of "good service" reward for Adderly, as his supposedly cushy Miscellaneous Affairs job is mostly concerned with mundane in-house administrative paperwork. During the series, Adderly consistently finds ways to use his vague, non-specific status as a representative of "Miscellaneous Affairs" to actively investigate anything the I.S.I. has overlooked, and regularly goes above and beyond his mundane duties to uncover and neutralize dread plots that the larger organization has failed to investigate.

Miscellaneous Affairs is officially run by Melville Greenspan (Welsh), a man fastidiously devoted to bureaucracy and unwilling to allow Adderly the freedom to pursue his outside interests.  The only other departmental staff member is Mona Ellerby (Seatle), Greenspan's over-qualified secretary who is addicted to adventure and romance novels.  Greenspan's superior is Major Jonathan B. Clack (Pogue), who is in charge of the I.S.I. as a whole, and is responsible for Adderly's reassignment from active field operations to Miscellaneous Affairs.

Through the course of the 44-episode run, Adderly repeatedly demonstrates his ability to perform the duties of an active field agent, even saving the life of Major Clack himself.  This only confirms to Clack that Adderly is an important asset at his current post.  It is implied that Clack may have created the Department of Miscellaneous Affairs to allow Adderly the freedom and flexibility to pursue various cases which the I.S.I. couldn't normally handle.

Episode guide

Season 1 (1986–87)

Season 2 (1987–88)

Broadcast history
Adderly aired from September 1986 through May 1987 (its first season) in the 11:30pm CBS Late Night slot on the CBS network.  For the second season (beginning in August 1987), the show's popularity prompted CBS to run episodes in prime time, but there was little promotion and the show didn't do well in the ratings.  CBS moved the show back to the 11:30pm time slot in September 1987 where it remained until the series ended. Canadian broadcasts of the series did not commence until January 1987.

References

External links 
 
 

Global Television Network original programming
CBS original programming
1980s Canadian comedy-drama television series
1986 Canadian television series debuts
1988 Canadian television series endings
Television shows based on American novels
Television series by Corus Entertainment
Television series by MGM Television